Kaoru Ishibashi (born November 4, 1975), who performs as Kishi Bashi, is an American singer, multi-instrumentalist, and songwriter currently based in Athens, Georgia. He was a founding member of Jupiter One and, for a few years, was a member of the band of Montreal. He embarked on his career as a solo artist in 2011, releasing his debut album 151a at Joyful Noise Recordings in 2012 to immediate fanfare and critical acclaim.

Biography
Born in Seattle, Washington, Kishi Bashi grew up in Norfolk, Virginia where both of his parents were professors at Old Dominion University. His mother is from Naha, Okinawa Prefecture and his father is from Iga, Mie Prefecture. After graduating from Matthew Fontaine Maury High School in 1994, he went to Cornell University College of Engineering.  At Cornell he co-founded a band named Tamarisk. After flunking out of Cornell, he went to study film scoring at Berklee College of Music before becoming a violinist.

In 2002, Ishibashi married violinist Keiko Ishibashi. After 19 years of marriage, they finalized their divorce in early 2021. Kishi Bashi began dating American philosopher and professor Kimberly Dill in August 2021. As of January 2023, Ishibashi and Dill are engaged. 

Kishi Bashi is also the singer and founding member of the New York electronic rock outfit, Jupiter One. In 2011, he started to record and perform as a solo artist, recorded and toured internationally as a violinist with diverse artists such as Regina Spektor, opening for Sondre Lerche, Alexi Murdoch, and of Montreal. He supported of Montreal on their spring 2012 tour.

Shortly after Ishibashi debuted his full-length solo album 151a on Indianapolis label Joyful Noise Recordings, NPR All Songs Considered host Bob Boilen listed Kishi Bashi as his favorite new artist of 2012 noting that he created "a radiant, uplifting soundscape"  with songs such as "Bright Whites." In the same year, Microsoft licensed "Bright Whites" for use in a commercial for Windows 8. Around the same time, Sony used Kishi Bashi's song "It All Began With A Burst" from the same album for a commercial introducing their Xperia Tablet S. In addition to these placements, Smart licensed "Chester's Burst Over The Hamptons" for their line of smart cars in the United States.

Kishi Bashi has since been invited to play in major festivals such as SXSW and Austin City Limits and gone on an extensive US tour with supporting acts such as The Last Bison (from his native Hampton Roads, Virginia). In early 2013, Kishi Bashi held a North American tour across the United States and Canada, continuing in EU and UK in spring 2013.

In 2014 Kishi Bashi released his own line of coffee through Jittery Joe's called Royal Daark Blend. Each purchase comes with an exclusive song download.

Kishi Bashi's songs are frequently synced.  His music also appears in Banana Split, The Babysitter's Club, God Friended Me, Into The Dark, Atypical, the DC Universe's Titans series, and others. He composed the soundtrack for the Apple + TV series Stillwater, and wrote the theme song to the television series Shrill. In July 2021, Kishi Bashi's song "I Am the Antichrist to You" was featured in season 5 episode 3 "A Rickconvenient Mort" of the animated television series Rick and Morty.

Discography

Studio albums

Live albums

Compilation albums
"7" Box Set" (including covers of the Talking Heads, ELO, and Beirut) (2013) – Joyful Noise

Extended plays
Room for Dream EP (2011) – Aerobic International / Joyful Noise
Philosophize! Chemicalize! EP (2013) – Joyful Noise
Room for Dream EP (2017) – Joyful Noise
Emigrant EP (2021) – Joyful Noise

Soundtracks 

 Stillwater: Vol. I (Apple TV+ Original Series Soundtrack) (2020) – Joyful Noise
 The Fourth Phase (2016)

Notes

Projects
Kishi Bashi's first EP, Room For Dream, came out in May 2011 on Aerobic International. Room For Dream features four songs, including a duet with Kevin Barnes and can only be purchased from downloading platforms such as iTunes or Bandcamp.

His live show is a solo performance based on live violin and vocal looping and beat boxing. He has often been compared to Andrew Bird and Owen Pallett.
Kishi Bashi's first full-length record, 151a, was released by Joyful Noise Recordings on April 10, 2012 after receiving partial funding through Kickstarter. The title '151a' refers to the Japanese term 一期一会 (pronounced the same way '151a' is in Japanese), which carries a meaning similar to "once in a lifetime". The three b-sides from the Room For Dream EP ("Conversations at the End of the World," "Evalyn, Summer has Arrived," and "Unicorns Die When You Leave") are included on the Australian/NZ edition of '151a' as bonus tracks. The Australian/NZ edition also replaces "Intro / Pathos, Pathos" with an instrumental version of the same track.

Kishi Bashi's second full-length album, Lighght (pronounced "light") was released on Joyful Noise Recordings on May 13, 2014.  The album's title is a one-word poem by Aram Saroyan.

His third studio album, Sonderlust, was released on September 16, 2016 by Joyful Noise Recordings. It was produced by Chris Taylor of Grizzly Bear.

On December 7, 2017, Ishibashi started a crowdfunding campaign on Indiegogo for a documentary film titled Omoiyari: A Songfilm by Kishi Bashi, which was released on March 14, 2022. The film details the struggles faced by incarcerated Japanese Americans during World War II. An album of songs created for the film was released by Joyful Noise Recordings on May 31, 2019, marking it as his fourth studio album.

References

External links

 Official Website
 interview and solo performance
 Podcast featuring "Manchester" by Kishi Bashi

1975 births
Living people
American alternative rock musicians
American rock violinists
American male violinists
Of Montreal members
Musicians from Seattle
Musicians from Norfolk, Virginia
Musicians from Athens, Georgia
American musicians of Japanese descent
Joyful Noise Recordings artists
21st-century violinists